Térraba-Sierpe Wetland, is a protected area in Costa Rica, managed under the Osa Conservation Area, it was created in 1994 by decree 22993-MIRENEM.   It has been designated as a protected Ramsar site since 1995.

References 

Ramsar sites in Costa Rica
Nature reserves in Costa Rica
Protected areas established in 1994